Battling Jane is a 1918 American silent comedy-drama film. It was directed by Elmer Clifton as a vehicle for Dorothy Gish and included some patriotic overtones. According to the Progressive Silent Film List at SilentEra.com, it is not known whether the film currently survives.

Plot
Jane, a waitress at a small town Maine hotel, assumes guardianship of a baby whose mother has died. The baby's rakish father, Dr. Sheldon, conspires to steal prize money won by Jane after she enters the child in a baby show. Jane manages to hold the doctor and his accomplice at bay until help arrives, then uses the prize money to help the war effort by purchasing Liberty Bonds and donating the rest to the Red Cross.

Cast

Release
The film was released in the United States in September, 1918, and in Canada shortly before the new year. In some venues it was accompanied by the comedy film The Goat with Fred Stone. It would be one of the most financially successful films made by Gish for Paramount.

Battling Jane received good reviews for its performances and its scenario: "(T)hough by turns pure comedy and pure melodrama, (it) is logically and consistently told." A reviewer for the Toronto World thought Dorothy Gish "a marvel of cleverness... as charming as in any of her previous parts. Director Elmer Clifton leaves nothing to be desired, either in point of acting or investiture. The support is unusually capable." The Evening Post of Wellington, New Zealand, found the lead role "quaint"; nonetheless it praised both the "cleverly depicted" story and the leading lady: "There are hundreds of Janes in the world, no doubt... Ms. Gish portrays the character realistically."

The film played at the Strand Theatre in Christchurch, New Zealand in June, 1919.

Like many American films of the time, Battling Jane was subject to cuts by city and state film censorship boards. For example, the Chicago Board of Censors required a cut, in Reel 2. of the knifing of a man in Jane's room and, in Reel 5, the last scene of man robbing the safe.

See also
The House That Shadows Built (1931 promotional film by Paramount)

References

External links

1918 films
1918 comedy-drama films
American war comedy-drama films
American World War I propaganda films
American silent feature films
American black-and-white films
1910s English-language films
Films directed by Elmer Clifton
Films set in Maine
Paramount Pictures films
Melodrama films
1910s American films
1910s war comedy-drama films
Silent war films
Silent American comedy-drama films